Rudolphe Cabanel (also Rudolph) (1763–1839) was a German architect, engineer and machinist, known for his work on British theatres.

Life
Cabanel was born at Aachen in 1762. He came to England early in life, and settled in London. He died in Mount Gardens, Lambeth, on 5 February 1839.

Works

Cabanel was employed in construction of several theatres. He designed the stage arrangements of the old Drury Lane Theatre for the reconstruction of the 1790s; in 1811, after the theatre was destroyed in a fire, the designs of Benjamin Dean Wyatt were preferred. He worked on the Royal Circus (later named the Surrey Theatre), 1805 (burnt down 30–1 January 1868), and the Royal Cobourg Theatre, 1818. At Sadler's Wells Theatre he reconstructed the auditorium, from 1802, following a model by Richard Hughes.

He was the inventor of the "Cabanel roof", and a number of theatrical machines.

Family
Harriot Cabanel, a dancer at the Royal Circus and Rudolphe's sister, married the actor Jack Helme.

Notes

Attribution

1763 births
1839 deaths
Architects from London
Engineers from Aachen
German emigrants to the Kingdom of Great Britain